Bala Bharatam is a 1972 Indian Telugu-language Hindu mythological film wherein most of the characters are played by children. The child actors include Baby Sridevi and Master Prabhakar.

Story
The plot is the famous Mahabharata story of Pandavas and Kauravas during their childhood days.

Cast
 Baby Sridevi as Dussala
 Anjali Devi as Kunti
 Kanta Rao as Pandu Raju
 S. V. Ranga Rao as Bhishma
 Master Prabhakar as Duryodhana
 Dhulipala as Sakhuni
 Mikkilineni as Dhritarashtra
 S. Varalakshmi as Gandhari
 Haranath as Narada
 M. Balayya as Mahendra
 Rajanala as Yama Dharma Raja
 Rao Gopal Rao as Pataala loka Adhipati
Chandrakala as Madri
Kaikala Satyanarayana as Kamsa
Nagayya as Sandeepani Maharshi
C. H. Narayana Rao as Drona
Malladi as Kripacharya
Thyagaraju as Drupada
P. J. Sarma as Brihaspathi
Aka V Subbarao as Thatha aryaka

Songs
 "Aadenoi Nagakanyaka Choodaloi Veerabalaka"
 "Bhale Bhale Bhale Bhale Pedabava"
 "Maanavude Mahaneeyudu Shaktiyutudu Yuktiparudu"
 "Narayana Nee Leela Navarasabharitam"
 "Taarangam Taarangam Taandavakrishna Taarangam"
 "Vindu Bhojanam Pasandu Bhojanam"

Features
Master Prabhakar also acted in Balaraju Katha. Sisindri Chittibabu and Yashoda Krishna have grown up and are presently living in Chennai. Baby Sumathi is his younger sister, who also a child actor and heroine in a movie.

References

External links
 Bala Bharatam at IMDb.

1972 films
Films based on the Mahabharata
Films directed by Kamalakara Kameswara Rao
Films scored by S. Rajeswara Rao
Indian children's films
1970s Telugu-language films